The 32nd TVyNovelas Awards, is an Academy of special awards to the best of soap opera and TV shows. The awards ceremony took place on March 23, 2014 in the Mexico City. The ceremony was televised in the Mexico by Canal de las estrellas in the United States by Univision.

Adrián Uribe, Galilea Montijo and Alan Tacher hosted the show. Amores verdaderos won seven awards including Best Telenovela of the Year, the most for the evening. Other winners Mentir para vivir won three awards, De que te quiero, te quiero won two awards and La Tempestad, La mujer del Vendaval and Libre para amarte won one each.

Summary of awards and nominations

Winners and nominees

Teleovelas

Others

Special awards

Summary of awards and nominations

Winners and nominees

Audience's Favorites

References 

TVyNovelas Awards
TVyNovelas Awards
TVyNovelas Awards
TVyNovelas Awards ceremonies